Perceptions is the second and final full-length studio album by the Christian rock band This Beautiful Republic.  The album was released by ForeFront Records on August 19, 2008. The album charted at No. 21 on the Billboard Top Christian albums chart and No. 16 on the Billboard Heatsseeker albums chart.

Track listing

References

2008 albums
This Beautiful Republic albums
ForeFront Records albums